Tangra may refer to:
 Tangra, the Bulgarian name of Tengri, the deity of Tengriism
 Tangra Mountains on Livingston Island, Antarctica, named after the deity
 Tangra 2004/05, an expedition to Antarctica
 Tangra (band), a Bulgarian band from the 1970s and 1980s
 Tangra, Kolkata, a neighborhood in the city of Kolkata  in West Bengal, India
WASP-21, a star named Tangra after the deity

See also 
 Tangara (disambiguation)